Kananaskis is an unincorporated community in Alberta's Rockies within the Municipal District of Bighorn No. 8 of Alberta, Canada. The community is located on the north shore of the Bow River.

Climate

See also 
List of communities in Alberta

References

External links 
M.D. of Bighorn No. 8

Localities in the Municipal District of Bighorn No. 8